Barry M. Trost (born June 13, 1941, in Philadelphia) is an American chemist who is the Job and Gertrud Tamaki Professor Emeritus in the School of Humanities and Sciences at Stanford University. The Tsuji-Trost reaction and the Trost ligand are named after him. He is prominent for advancing the concept of atom economy.

Early life and education 
Trost was born in Philadelphia, Pennsylvania on June 13, 1941. He studied at the University of Pennsylvania and obtained his B.A. in 1962. He then attended the Massachusetts Institute of Technology for graduate school, where he worked with Herbert O. House on enolate anions, the Mannich reaction, and the Robinson annulation. Trost graduated with his Ph.D. in 1965.

Independent career 
Trost moved to the University of Wisconsin–Madison to begin his independent career, and was promoted to Professor of Chemistry in 1969, and the Vilas Research Professor in 1982. In 1987, he moved to Stanford University as Professor of Chemistry, and was appointed the Job and Gertrud Tamaki Professor of Humanities and Sciences in 1990. He previously served as Chair of the Department of Chemistry. 

, Trost has an h-index of 161 according to Google Scholar and of 140 (1040 documents) according to Scopus.

Research
Trost's research focused on chemical synthesis. In order to build complex target molecules from simple molecules, Trost developed new reactions and reagents, and utilized cascade reactions and tandem reactions. Target molecules have potential applications as novel catalysts, as well as antibiotic and anti-tumor therapeutics.

References

Sources
 Biographical Data at Trost's Home Page

External links

 

21st-century American chemists
Organic chemists
1941 births
Scientists from Philadelphia
University of Pennsylvania alumni
Living people
Members of the United States National Academy of Sciences
Massachusetts Institute of Technology alumni
Stanford University faculty
University of Wisconsin–Madison faculty